Christina McHale was the defending champion but chose to compete at the 2020 Italian Open instead.

Sara Sorribes Tormo won the title, defeating Irina Bara in the final, 6–3, 6–4.

Seeds

Draw

Finals

Top half

Bottom half

References

Main Draw

Open de Cagnes-sur-Mer - Singles